A Boy Made of Blocks is a novel by video game journalist Keith Stuart, first published in 2016 by St. Martin's Press.

Publishers Weekly described the book as a "funny and insightful novel about a neurotypical father's struggle to connect with his autistic son." The book also received reviews from publications including The Guardian and Irish Examiner.

References 

2016 British novels
Books about autism
St. Martin's Press books